Novosharipovo (Yañı Şärip) is a rural locality (a village) in Sokolovsky Selsoviet, Davlekanovsky District, Bashkortostan, Russia. The population was 59 as of 2010.

Geography 
Novosharipovo is located 10 km southeast of Davlekanovo (the district's administrative centre) by road. Sokolovka is the nearest rural locality.

References 

Rural localities in Davlekanovsky District